The Washington State Cougars college football team represents the Washington State University in the North Division of the Pac-12 Conference (Pac-12). The Cougars compete as part of the National Collegiate Athletic Association (NCAA) Division I Football Bowl Subdivision. The program has had 34 head coaches since it began play during the 1894 season. The current interim head coach is Jake Dickert.

Key

Coaches

Notes

References

Washington State

Washington (state) sports-related lists